(Pronounced 'Lĕh-'nérd 'Skin-'nérd) is the debut album by American rock band Lynyrd Skynyrd, released in 1973. Several of the album's songs remain among the band's most well-known: "Gimme Three Steps", "Simple Man", "Tuesday's Gone", and "Free Bird", the last of which launched the band to national stardom.

The album was certified gold on December 18, 1974, and double platinum on July 21, 1987, by the RIAA. It peaked at 27 on the Billboard 200 in 1975.

Overview
Most of the songs on the album had been in the band's live repertoire for some time. The band found a rural rehearsal space near Jacksonville, Florida, which they nicknamed "Hell House" due to the long hours spent there jamming in the intense Florida heat, and it was there that they composed and ran through the songs endlessly until they were perfected. Producer Al Kooper marveled at how well prepared the band were once they entered the studio; every note was immutable and absolutely no improvisation was allowed.

Bassist Leon Wilkeson left the band a few months before the album's recording sessions. Ex-Strawberry Alarm Clock guitarist Ed King had been impressed with the band after an earlier incarnation of Lynyrd Skynyrd had opened for Strawberry Alarm Clock in Florida circa 1970. He told vocalist Ronnie Van Zant to keep him in mind if he ever needed a guitarist, and he was invited to replace Wilkeson as bassist. Once the recording sessions were wrapping up, Van Zant decided that King would better serve the band as a guitarist, and he visited Wilkeson and convinced him to rejoin. Wilkeson returned to the band and King moved to lead guitar, giving the band what would become their trademark "Three Guitar Army" along with Allen Collins and Gary Rossington. Wilkeson was back in the band by the time the band shot the cover photo for the album, and appears on the cover, as well as being acknowledged in the liner notes.

Atlanta Rhythm Section drummer and friend of the band Robert Nix was requested by Van Zant and Kooper to play on the track "Tuesday's Gone".

As the band worked up "Simple Man" in rehearsal, Kooper expressed his feeling that the song was weak and should not be included on the album. The band felt differently on both counts and could not change Kooper's mind. Ultimately, Van Zant escorted the producer outside to his car and ordered him to remain there until the song was recorded. The band recorded the song on their own with the producer absent from the studio, and it subsequently became one of Lynyrd Skynyrd's best known tracks.

The album was re-released in 2001 as an expanded version with bonus tracks, including the two B-sides to the original singles and three previously unreleased demos from the album sessions. Sales through 2014 were an estimated two million units internationally.

Cover art
The cover photograph was taken on Main Street in Jonesboro, Georgia, and shows, from left to right, Leon Wilkeson (seated), Billy Powell (seated), Ronnie Van Zant, Gary Rossington (seated), Bob Burns, Allen Collins and Ed King. The photo was the last in a long day of shooting for the album cover, and Rossington vomited on the sidewalk seconds after it was taken. To the right of Ed King in the background is a lightning strike in the sky. It is not fabricated and the band did not know it was there until after they saw the released album cover.

With Gary Rossington's death in 2023, there are no surviving members of the band pictured on the cover.

Reception
(Pronounced 'Lĕh-'nérd 'Skin-'nérd) immediately put the band on the rock-and-roll map. Upon its release, rock journalist Robert Christgau acknowledged the quality of the songs and gave the album an "A" rating while referring to Lynyrd Skynyrd as a "staunchly untranscendent band". Kooper, a close friend of Pete Townshend, secured the band a spot opening for The Who on their American tour, and Lynyrd Skynyrd was subsequently exposed to much larger audiences than they had ever seen before.

In 2012, Rolling Stone magazine ranked the album number 403 on its list of the 500 Greatest Albums of All Time, and it was later ranked number 381 in the 2020 edition.

Track listing

 Sides one and two were combined as tracks 1–8 on CD reissues.

Personnel

Lynyrd Skynyrd
Ronnie Van Zant – lead vocals, lyrics
Gary Rossington – lead guitar (tracks 2–5, 7); rhythm guitar (1, 6, 8); slide guitar (8)
Allen Collins – lead guitar (1, 4, 8); rhythm guitar (2, 3, 5–7); acoustic guitar (8)
Ed King – bass (all tracks except 2, 6); guitar fills (2, during piano solo); lead guitar (6)
Billy Powell – keyboards
Bob Burns – drums (all tracks except 2 and 6)

Additional personnel
Al Kooper (Roosevelt Gook) – bass (2, 6); backing vocals (2); mandolin & bass drum (6); organ (4, 7, 8); Mellotron (2, 8) 
Robert Nix – drums (2)
Bobbye Hall – percussion (3, 5)
Steve Katz – harmonica (6)

Technical
 Al Kooper – producer, engineer
 Bob "Tub" Langford – engineer
 Rodney Mills – engineer
 Thomas Hill – photography
 Michael Diehl – design

Charts

Certifications

References

External links 

Lynyrd Skynyrd albums
1973 debut albums
MCA Records albums
Albums produced by Al Kooper